Andorra is a small, landlocked country in southwestern Europe, located in the eastern Pyrenees mountain range and bordered by Spain and France. With an area of 468 km², it is the sixth smallest country in Europe and also the largest of the European microstates.

These are dissected by three narrow valleys in a Y shape that combine into one as the main stream, the Gran Valira river, leaves the country for Spain (at Andorra's lowest point of ).

Andorra's climate is similar to that of its neighbours' temperate climates, but its higher elevation means there is, on average, more snow in winter, lower humidity, and it is slightly cooler in summer. There are, on average, 300 days per year of sunshine.

Phytogeographically, Andorra belongs to the Atlantic European province of the Circumboreal Region within the Boreal Kingdom. According to the WWF, the territory of Andorra belongs to the ecoregion of Pyrenees conifer and mixed forests.

Landslides and avalanches are the main natural hazards. There are frequent earthquakes below Richter magnitude 2. There is no historical record of any damaging earthquakes in Andorra, but the Andorran government has studied the possibility of a future one.

Mountains

All of Andorra is mountainous, and in total, there are 65 mountain peaks.

Along the border with France, from west to east, the highest mountains are Pic de Médécourbe, which is the western tripoint international boundary of Andorra, France, and Spain, Pic de Cataperdis and Pic de Tristaina, Pic de Font Blanca in the northwest; Pic de Siguer, Pic de la Serrera and Pic d'Anrodat in the north; and Pic de Noé, Pic de la Cabaneta and Roc Mélé in the east.

Along the border with Spain, from west to east, the highest mountains are Pic de Médécourbe, Pic de Coma Pedrosa, Port de Cabús and Pic dels Llacs in the west; Pic Negre, Torre dels Soldats, and Pic de la Portelleta in the south.

In the east, near where the borders of the two countries meet, lies Pic d’Envalira and Pic dels Pessons. A lake, Estany de l'Estanyó, and a mountain, Pic de l’Estanyó lie just east of El Serrat and are accessible only by hiking trail.

Lakes and rivers
Andorra is drained almost entirely by a single basin whose main river, the Gran Valira, exits the country in the south near the Spain–Andorra road border crossing.

The Valira del Nord is the northwest tributary, flowing from near El Serrat through the settlements of Les Salines, Arans, La Cortinada, Sornàs, Ordino, and La Massana — where it meets the Tristaina River — and eventually through Les Escaldes where it meets the Valira d'Orient forming the Gran Valira.

The Valira d'Orient is the northeast tributary, flowing from near Grau Roig through Soldeu, Canillo, Encamp, and Les Escaldes where it meets the Madriu River and then the Valira del Nord, becoming the Gran Valira.

There are also several much smaller drainage basins that span Andorra's borders with France and Spain. The most notable of these is the Pic de Maià basin whose main river, the Sant Josep, flows easterly out of the country into France and is a tributary of the Ariège, which is in the Garonne basin (Atlantic).

Andorra has 172 lakes, of which the largest is Estanys de Juclar near Pic de Noé in the north east.

Climate
The climate in Andorra varies greatly with elevation. The valleys have a oceanic climate that is similar to the temperate climate of Andorra's neighbours, but because of the higher elevation, winters tend to be more severe, the humidity lower, and summers slightly cooler. Regions above the Alpine tree line at about  have an alpine climate and alpine tundra. Snow completely covers the northern valleys for several months. There are, on average, 300 days per year of sunshine. Average daily peak insolation varies from 1150 W/m2 in June to 280 W/m2 in December.

The driest parish is Sant Julià de Lòria ( per year) in the south, and the wettest is Canillo ( per year) in the north. Annual precipitation can exceed  the highest mountainous areas. The driest months tend to be January and February, and the wettest, May, June, and November. During the summer months, there are very few rainy days, but the rainfall can be very heavy because it is associated with thunderstorms.

Natural hazards

Avalanches
There is a risk of avalanches from mid winter to early summer. Avalanche control methods such as snow clearing by controlled blast charges, snow nets, snow fences, deflectors, rigid barriers, and snow compaction are used in Andorra to prevent dangerous avalanches.

1996 Arinsal avalanche
The 1996 Arinsal avalanche was an exceptionally powerful powder-snow avalanche that followed several days of very heavy snowfalls and high winds. At 19:00 on 8 February 1996, the avalanche fell on the village of Arinsal destroying or severely damaging many cars and buildings and hotels including the crest hotel the rocky mountain bar and above apartments the asterics bar and little damage to three blocks of flats that were under construction by a Russian company and still are under construction; evacuation of the residents and tourists in the village had been completed 1½ hours before the avalanche, and consequently there were no deaths, but the material and economic damages were large. Afterwards, the government ordered the construction of a snow dam across the Arinsal valley to stop future avalanches.

1970 Pas de la Casa avalanche
The 1970 Pas de la Casa avalanche was a powder-snow avalanche that happened after a severe snowstorm left  of new snow atop the existing snow pack on the mountain slopes above Pas de la Casa. It then hit the village, damaging several buildings including a dispensary and killing a nurse. In 1970, Pas de la Casa had far fewer buildings than it does now, so the damage was relatively limited. The new CG-2 goes through the Envalira Tunnel, thus avoiding Pas de la Casa and the risk of avalanches.

Landslides
Landslides are a frequent occurrence in Andorra; they have tended to follow periods of heavy rainfall.

A landslide during the evening rush hour on 25 January 2008 deposited  of loosely bound soil and rocks from the mountain slope above onto the main road CG-3 (Avinguda del Través de la Massana) between La Massana and Ordino, blocking it for three days, as well as completely covering an open-air car park and several parked cars. The only damage was to property, and nobody was injured, but the residents of a block of flats adjacent to the landslide were evacuated as the building was deemed unsafe and it remains vacant. The cause of the landslide was determined to be settlement of the earth due to inadequate ground reinforcement in the construction and excavation of the car park 30 years previously.

On 7 July 2009, a rock landslide fell  onto the CG-3 main road between La Massana and Andorra La Vella, blocking the road near the entrance to the Pont Pla Tunnel for three hours. Protective nets on the mountain side caught most of the rockfall, but  went over the nets and fell onto the road and pavement.

Earthquakes
The Pyrenees and Catalonia have frequent and sometimes destructive earthquakes — the largest in recorded history being the Catalan earthquake of 1428 with an estimated magnitude of IX on the MSK scale, equivalent to 6.0–6.5 on the Richter magnitude scale. However, earthquakes whose epicentres are inside Andorra tend to be smaller than magnitude 2. An earthquake of magnitude 4.2 on 5 October 1999 in nearby Bagnères-de-Luchon (France) was widely felt in Andorra, causing public alarm. The Andorran Government has studied the possibility of a damaging earthquake in Andorra.

Extreme points

Latitude and longitude

 North : Basers de Font Blanca
 South : Conangle – Riu Runer
 West : Coll de l'Aquell
 East : Riu de la Palomera – Riu Arièja

Elevation
 Maximum : Pic del Comapedrosa, 
 Minimum : Conflent del riu Runer, 

Centre
 Geographical centre : near Encamp,

See also

References

 

bn:অ্যান্ডোরা#ভূগোল